The Alhucemas Islands is a group of islands and one of the Spanish plazas de soberanía just off the Moroccan coast in the Alboran Sea.

Overview
Peñón de Alhucemas, together with the islets of Isla de Mar and Isla de Tierra slightly to the west, form the Alhucemas Islands.

The rock is entirely occupied by a fort, several houses, and a church. It is one of several peñones, or rock-fortresses, off the coast of Northern Africa.

Spanish rule dates back to 1559, when the Saadis ceded several territories to Spain in exchange for Spanish help against Ottoman armies. In 1673, Spain sent a garrison to the island of Peñón de Alhucemas, and has permanently occupied it since then. The islands are also located near the landing place the Spanish and French expeditionary forces used in 1925 during the Rif War. Morocco has contested Spanish sovereignty over the islets since Morocco received its independence in 1956.

In 2012 the Spanish military garrison in the fort on Peñón de Alhucemas comprised an infantry section of 25–30 men from the 32nd Mixed Artillery Regiment, plus personnel from the marine services with an inflatable boat for reaching supply vessels.

On 29 August 2012, 19 sub-Saharan immigrants traversed the short expanse of water between Morocco and the Isla de Tierra. These individuals camped on the island, hoping to somehow gain access into the Spanish mainland. They were shortly joined by an additional 68 immigrants on 2 September 2012. Refugees and illegal immigration from sub-Saharan nations has been a problem that Spain, and the European Union as a whole, has been trying to solve. Since the islets had an "undefined internal status", the immigrants did not benefit from the Spanish immigration laws and, under a joint operation, Spanish troops tended to the women, children, and medical needs of the immigrants, then turned them back over to Morocco. Moroccan forces promptly deported the individuals across the Algerian border. The Spanish Army has since stationed a small camp on the Isla de Tierra to discourage new attempts to illegally cross into Spanish territory. The handling and deportation of these individuals have been criticized by the Ombudsman of the Spanish Parliament, the Defensor del Pueblo, and by various NGOs and organizations.

See also
 Plazas de soberanía
 List of Spanish colonial wars in Morocco
 Spanish Protectorate of Morocco

References 

Islands of Africa
Islands of Spain
Mediterranean islands
Plazas de soberanía
Territorial disputes of Spain
Alhucemas
Sea forts